Rhuan Rogerio Elias Barbosa (born December 18, 1991 in Guaranésia), simply known as Rhuan, is a Brazilian footballer who plays as defender for Santo André.

Career statistics

References

External links

1991 births
Living people
Brazilian footballers
Association football defenders
Londrina Esporte Clube players